ShamRain is a Finnish band which plays slow, dreamlike music, also categorized as atmospheric rock music. They were established in 2000 by Janne Jukarainen and Matti Reinola.

Discography
Pieces (MCD/2002)
Empty World Excursion (2003)
ShamRain (EP/2004)
Someplace Else (2005)
Deeper Into The Night (EP/2006)
Goodbye to All That (2007)
Isolation (2011)

Shamrain also appears on the track 'Charlotte Sometimes' on the album Our Voices - a Tribute to The Cure (2004)

Line-up
Kalle Pyyhtinen - guitars, keyboards
Mikko Kolari - guitars
Matti Reinola - bass guitar, keyboards
Minna Sihvonen - vocals
Jukka Laine - drums

External links
Official ShamRain website
ShamRain @ MySpace.com

Finnish rock music groups
Finnish gothic rock groups
Musical groups established in 2000